Leucania  insulicola is a species of moth of the family Noctuidae. It is found in most parts of central, western and southern Africa and on the islands of the Indian Ocean.

It has a length of approx. 18–20 mm = wingspan around 36-40mm.

References

Leucania
Moths described in 1852
Moths of Madagascar
Moths of Sub-Saharan Africa
Lepidoptera of the Democratic Republic of the Congo
Lepidoptera of West Africa
Moths of the Comoros
Moths of Mauritius
Fauna of the Gambia
Moths of Réunion